August is the second novel in the Wayfarers trilogy, also known as the August trilogy, by the Norwegian author Knut Hamsun. The novel was published on October 1, 1930.

Plot
Twenty years have passed since the action in Wayfarers, and August has settled in his home village of Polden. August's identity is built on a grand delusion and he lives a good and simple life as a sailor who has just returned from America. August is a man who wants to make changes, improve, and renew everything.

References

Novels by Knut Hamsun
20th-century Norwegian novels
1930 Norwegian novels